CBC Radio 3 Sessions is a Canadian radio program, which airs on the satellite radio network CBC Radio 3. Hosted by Tariq Hussain, the program airs in-studio sessions by Canadian musicians in the Radio 3 studios, including both live song performances and interview segments. Two artists are profiled in each episode, each of which performs for half an hour.

Some of the sessions predate Radio 3's presence as a radio network, dating back to its time as a webcast provider. One of its projects during that era was Just Concerts, a website which aired both studio sessions and recordings of regular concerts. The studio sessions began to air as a radio program in February 2007.

The program airs at 11 a.m. PT (2 p.m. ET) on Saturdays, midnight PT (3 a.m. ET) on Sundays and 4 a.m. PT (7 a.m. ET) on Mondays. For the first four episodes, the Sunday time slot was also part of the network's simulcast on CBC Radio 2. The program is also available as streaming audio from CBC Radio 3's website, and has also aired as a television series on the CBC's digital bold network.

Podcast

On September 12, 2007, CBC Radio 3 introduced the CBC Radio 3 Sessions podcast, which allows anyone to download the program onto their computer or digital audio player. Each podcast session features a single artist.

Sirius Satellite Sessions Episodes
 Shout Out Out Out Out, We Are Wolves
 Hot Hot Heat, Shapes and Sizes
 Destroyer, The FemBots
 Jason Collett, Christine Fellows
 Dragon Fli Empire, The Phonograff
 Immaculate Machine, The Meligrove Band
 Joel Plaskett, Cuff the Duke
 Shotgun & Jaybird, Blood Meridian
 Tokyo Police Club, You Say Party! We Say Die!
 The Acorn, Precious Fathers
 The Flatliners, The Black Halos
 Vailhalen, The Blood Lines
 The Inflation Kills, Sylvie
 Malajube, Novillero
 Les Georges Leningrad, They Shoot Horses, Don't They?
 Pony Up, The Hot Springs
 The Sadies, The Buttless Chaps
 Wintersleep, Bend Sinister
 Pride Tiger, Raising the Fawn
 The Constantines, Ladyhawk
 Hylozoists, The Old Soul
 Matt Mays, Matthew Barber
 The Golden Dogs, Two Hours Traffic
 Jill Barber, Amy Millan
 Henri Fabergé and the Adorables, The Bicycles
 Champion, Telefuzz

Podcast Sessions Episodes

See also
 Bold Concert Series
 East Coast Sessions

References

CBC Radio 3 programs
2007 radio programme debuts
Canadian music radio programs
2000s Canadian music television series